Coleophora micromeriae is a moth of the family Coleophoridae. It is found in the Canary Islands.

The larvae feed on Micromeria varia. Larvae can be found from January to March.

References

micromeriae
Moths described in 1908
Moths of Africa